is a waterfall located in the city of Yonezawa, Yamagata Prefecture, Japan, on a branch of the Abukuma River. It is one of "Japan’s Top 100 Waterfalls", in a listing published by the Japanese Ministry of the Environment in 1990.
The falls form several streams over a large  outcropping of Rhyolite.

External links
 
   Ministry of Environment

Waterfalls of Japan
Landforms of Yamagata Prefecture
Tourist attractions in Yamagata Prefecture